Jordan Telecom Group is the principal telecommunications services provider in the Kingdom of Jordan. Jordan Telecom is responsible for the administration of the basic telecommunications infrastructure which forms the base of Jordan's telecommunications services industry.

Upon privatization on 23 January 2000, Jordan Telecom Group was 60% owned by Jordan's government.  The remaining 40% of the group's shares were owned by JITCO Investment Group, a holding company consisting of Orange (88%) and the Arab Bank (12%).

The Jordan Telecom Group (JTG) owns the following telecommunications companies:

 Jordan Telecom
 Orange Jordan
 eDimension

Jordan Telecom

Jordan Telecom is a privatized telephone company, founded in 1971 and now belonging to the Jordan Telecom Group. It holds the telecom license, but the mobile component is managed by Orange Jordan.

History
The history of telecommunications in Jordan can be traced back to early 1921. After the foundation of the Hashemite Kingdom of Jordan, the Ministry of Post, Telegraph and Telephony was established which further developed the country's Telecommunications Services. In 1961, the first automatic telephone switch service was introduced utilizing an electromechanical switch with a capacity of approximately 5000 lines. In 1971, a new government-controlled body, the Telecommunications Corporation (T.C.C) was set up to take over the day-to-day running of the communications services such as telephone, telegraph and telex. Also a satellite earth station at Baqa'a was in operation using Intelsat facilities. From 1973 to 1985, Jordan Telecom's network underwent significant expansion as part of a government investment program. In 1993 the government was able to initiate a development program known as the National Telecommunications Program (NTP).

External links
 Orange Jordan

Companies based in Amman
Orange S.A.
Telecommunications companies established in 1997
Telecommunications companies of Jordan
Companies listed on the Amman Stock Exchange

References